Josef Franz Wagner (20 March 1856 – 5 June 1908) was an Austrian military bandmaster and composer. He is sometimes referred to as "The Austrian March King".

He is best known for his 1893 march "Unter dem Doppeladler" (Op. 159) or "Under the Double Eagle", referring to the double eagle in the coat of arms of Austria-Hungary. The march became a favourite part of the repertoire of American composer and bandleader John Philip Sousa, whose band recorded it three times. The piece was the official regimental march of Austrian Artillery Regiment Number 2 until its dissolution in 2007.

Wagner is also known for the march "Tiroler Holzhackerbuab'n" (Op. 356), or "Tyrolean Lumberjacks". In 1895, his only opera, Der Herzbub, premiered in Vienna.

Tiroler Holzhackerbuab'n

References

External links
 

1856 births
1908 deaths
19th-century male musicians
20th-century male musicians
Austrian opera composers
Austrian male composers
Military music composers

Male opera composers